The General George Stakes  is  an American Thoroughbred horse race run annually on Presidents' Day in mid February at Laurel Park Racecourse in Laurel, Maryland. A Grade III event, it is open to horses age three and older. Raced on dirt over a distance of seven furlongs, it currently offers a purse of $250,000. Originally run as a handicap, the race is currently run under allowance weight conditions.  

The race is named for General George Washington (1731–1799), first president of The United States and Commanding General of the American Revolutionary Army. The General typically draws the third highest crowd of the year at Laurel Park Race Course, trailing only the Maryland Million and the Frank J. De Francis Memorial Dash Stakes in average attendance.

The race was held at Bowie Race Course from 1973–84 and at Pimlico Race Course in 1986. It was not held in 1979, 1982–83 or 2006. In 2006, the General George Handicap was not run due to concerns over an outbreak of the equine herpesvirus that shut down all racing in Maryland for several weeks.

Records

Speed record:
 7 furlongs – 1:20.95 – Greenspring (2010)
  miles – 1:44.00 – Templar Hill (1987)

Most wins by a horse:
 No horse has ever won the General George Handicap more than once

Most wins by a jockey:
 3 – Mike Luzzi (1991, 1999, 2012)

Most wins by a trainer:
 2 – Bruce N. Levine (2008, 2015)
 2 – Jerry Robb (1987 & 1989)

Most wins by an owner:
 2 – Four Roses Thoroughbreds (1998 & 2007)

Winners of the General George Stakes since 1973

See also
 General George Handicap "top three finishers" and starters

References

 The 2008 General George Handicap at the NTRA

External links
Laurel Park racetrack

Graded stakes races in the United States
Open mile category horse races
1973 establishments in Maryland
Laurel Park Racecourse
Horse races in Maryland
Recurring sporting events established in 1973